John Fitzgerald Lee (May 5, 1813 – June 17, 1884) was the Judge Advocate General of the United States Army from 1849 until 1862 and the first Judge Advocate General since the position had been vacant since 1802. He was a 
member of the Virginia Lee family being a grandson of Richard Henry Lee and a cousin of Robert E. Lee, the Confederate general who became commander of the Confederate States Army during the American Civil War.  He was also the brother of Samuel Phillips Lee, a rear admiral in the United States Navy, and the brother-in-law of Montgomery Blair, the postmaster general under Abraham Lincoln.

The office of Judge Advocate General had been formally discontinued on March 2, 1821, when the military establishment of the United States had been reduced.  The office was brought back on March 2, 1849, for the president to appoint a suitable captain of the army.

His son, also named John Fitzgerald Lee (1848–1926), served as president of the St. Louis Bar Association, president of the David Rankin School of Mechanical Trades, and director of the St. Louis Public Library.  A dormitory on Washington University is named after this younger John F. Lee.

See also
Lee Family Digital Archive

References

External links

1813 births
1884 deaths
Union Army officers
Judge Advocates General of the United States Army
John
19th-century American lawyers
People from Fairfax County, Virginia